Henri Laaksonen was the defending champion but chose not to defend his title.

Wu Yibing won the title after Lu Yen-hsun retired in the final after losing the first set 6–7(6–8).

Seeds

Draw

Finals

Top half

Bottom half

References
Main Draw
Qualifying Draw

Shanghai Challenger - Singles
2017 Singles